Frederik Ibsen (born 28 March 1997) is a Danish professional footballer who plays as a goalkeeper for Lyngby Boldklub.

Career

Vendsyssel
Ibsen came up through FC Copenhagen's youth ranks. Before getting his first team debut for the club, Ibsen went on a trial at Vendsyssel FF in July 2017. The trial went well and Ibsen signed with the club one week later on a two-year contract.

He was the second choice in his time at the club, playing only three games for the club in that season, which all was in the Danish Cup.

Return to Copenhagen
On 31 August 2018, FC Copenhagen announced, that Ibsen had returned to the club. Ibsen was the third choice at the club and got his official debut on 19 May 2019. Copenhagen was already champions, and therefore, manager Ståle Solbakken decided to rest first keeper, Jesse Joronen, while second keeper Stephan Andersen was injured. Copenhagen lost the game 4-3.

Kolding IF
On 24 January 2020, Danish 1st Division club Kolding IF confirmed that they had signed Ibsen on a contract until the summer 2021.

Lyngby
After one and a half years at Kolding, it was confirmed on 7 June 2021, that newly relegated Danish 1st Division club Lyngby Boldklub, had signed Ibsen on a two-year contract.

Career statistics

References

External links

1997 births
Living people
Footballers from Copenhagen
Danish men's footballers
Association football goalkeepers
Danish Superliga players
Danish 1st Division players
Vendsyssel FF players
F.C. Copenhagen players
Kolding IF players
Lyngby Boldklub players